Lower Seyhan Irrıgation Project is one of the major irrigation projects of Turkey, which is located in the Seyhan River basin.

Location
Seyhan is a -long river in southern Turkey, which flows into the Mediterranean Sea. The upper reaches of the river is in Taurus Mountains. It flows within the city of Adana. Seyhan Dam is located to the north of the city and the irrigation project is situated to the south.

The Project
The irrigation project comprises four phases. In the second phase between 1968 and 1974, land covering  was irrigated. The third project phase took place between 1974 and 1985, and dealt mainly with Tarsus area to the west . In this phase,  was irrigated and  land was protected against floods. The forth phase, which is still under construction deals with the coastal area.

Turkey's top 50 civil engineering projects
Turkish Chamber of Civil Engineers lists the first phase of this Project  as one of the fifty civil engineering feats in Turkey, a list of remarkable engineering projects realized in the first 50 years of the chamber.

References

Irrigation in Turkey
Irrigation projects
Economic history of Turkey
Mediterranean Region, Turkey
Planned developments